Olav Kallenberg (born 1939) is a probability theorist known for his work on exchangeable stochastic processes and for his graduate-level textbooks and monographs. Kallenberg is a professor of mathematics at Auburn University in Alabama in the USA.

From 1991 to 1994, Kallenberg served as the Editor-in-Chief of Probability Theory and Related Fields (a leading journal in probability).

Biography

Olav Kallenberg was educated in Sweden. He has worked as a probabilist in Sweden and in the United States.

Sweden
Kallenberg was born and educated in Sweden, with an undergraduate exam in engineering physics from Royal Institute of Technology (KTH) in Stockholm. Kallenberg entered doctoral studies in mathematical statistics at KTH, but left his studies to work in operations analysis for a consulting firm in Gothenburg. While in Gothenburg, Kallenberg also taught at Chalmers University of Technology, from which he received his Ph.D. in 1972 under the supervision of Harald Bergström.
After earning his doctoral degree, Kallenberg stayed with Chalmers as a lecturer.

Kallenberg was appointed a full professor in Uppsala University.

United States
Later he moved to the United States. Since 1986, he has been Professor of Mathematics and Statistics at Auburn University.

Honours and awards
In 1977, Kallenberg was awarded the Rollo Davidson Prize from Cambridge University, and Kallenberg was only the second recipient of the prize in history.

Kallenberg is a Fellow of the Institute of Mathematical Statistics.

In April 2006 Kallenberg was selected Auburn's 32nd annual Distinguished Graduate Faculty Lecturer at Auburn. Kallenberg delivered the 2003 AACTM Lewis-Parker Lecture at the University of Alabama in Huntsville.

Selected publications

Books
 Kallenberg, O., Probabilistic Symmetries and Invariance Principles. Springer -Verlag, New York (2005). 510 pp. .
 Kallenberg, O., Foundations of Modern Probability, 2nd ed. Springer Series in Statistics. (2002). 650 pp. ; 3rd ed. Probability Theory and Stochastic Modelling. (2021). 946 pp.   
 Kallenberg, O., Random Measures, 4th edition.  Academic Press, New York, London; Akademie-Verlag, Berlin (1986).

Scientific papers
 Homogeneity and the strong Markov property. Ann. Probab. 15 (1987), 213–240.
 Spreading and predictable sampling in exchangeable sequences and processes. Ann. Probab. 16 (1988), 508–534.
 Multiple integration with respect to Poisson and Lévy processes (with J. Szulga). Probab. Th. Rel. Fields (1989), 101–134.
 General Wald-type identities for exchangeable sequences and processes. Probab. Th. Rel. Fields 83 (1989), 447–487.
 Random time change and an integral representation for marked stopping times. Probab. Th. Rel. Fields 86 (1990), 167–202.
 Some dimension-free features of vector-valued martingales (with R. Sztencel). Probab. Th. Rel. Fields 88 (1991), 215–247.
 Symmetries on random arrays and set-indexed processes. J. Theor. Probab. 5 (1992), 727–765.
 Random arrays and functionals with multivariate rotational symmetries. Probab. Th. Rel. Fields 103 (1995), 91–141.
 On the existence of universal functional solutions to classical SDEs. Ann. Probab. 24 (1996), 196–205.

References

External links
 Brief CV for the 2003 Lewis-Parker Lecturer .

Living people
20th-century American mathematicians
21st-century American mathematicians
Swedish emigrants to the United States
Swedish mathematicians
Probability theorists
KTH Royal Institute of Technology alumni
Chalmers University of Technology alumni
Auburn University faculty
1939 births
Measure theorists
Academic staff of Uppsala University
Probability Theory and Related Fields editors